Kurt Fischer is the name of:
 Kurt Rudolf Fischer (1922–2014), Jewish-Austrian philosopher
 Kurt W. Fischer (born 1943), American professor of education

See also
Curtis Fischer